Campi Flegrei del Mar di Sicilia is a field of submarine volcanoes located south-west of Sicily. It includes the vent of Ferdinandea, otherwise known as Graham Island, which erupted and emerged above sea level in 1831, and encompasses a larger volcano known as Empedocles. The last recorded eruption was in 1867, from a vent named Pinne. There was mild seismic unrest at Ferdinandea in 2000 - 2002. At its highest, Campi Flegrei comes to 8 meters (26 feet) below sea level.

See also
List of volcanoes in Italy

References

Submarine volcanoes
Volcanoes of Italy
Former islands from the last glacial maximum